Yves Marie-Édouard Devernay (Tourcoing 9 May 1937 – Tourcoing 10 December 1990) was a 20th-century French organist, improviser and composer.

Biography 

First a pupil of Jeanne Joulain at the Roubaix conservatory, in 1958 he joined Rolande Falcinelli's class at the Conservatoire de Paris, after spending one year in the Lille Conservatory.

A professor of organ at the conservatories of Roubaix and Valenciennes, he was also a virtuoso organist with a great technique combined with an undeniable talent for improvisation.

He died of a heart attack in 1990.

On 10 December 2010, a plaque was affixed at the entrance of the cemetery of the town of Mouvaux, where he rests.

During 40 years, his uncle Édouard Devernay played the organ of the Notre-Dame-des-Victoires church in Trouville-sur-Mer (Calvados) from 1912 to 1952.

Works 
 Several pieces for choir and organ
 2 concertos for organ and orchestra
 Ballade for oboe and organ 
 Dialogue for piano and organ

Bibliography 

 In Mémoriam Yves Devernay (1937-1990), 98 pages, published by his friends
 Étienne Delahaye, À Saint-Christophe de Tourcoing avec Yves Devernay. L'Orgue, n° 290, 2010 – II.
 Étienne Delahaye, Yves Devernay (1937-1990). La passion au bout des doigts. Orgues Nouvelles, n°.23, winter 2014

Discography 
 Hommage à Yves Devernay - Inauguration du Grand Orgue de Notre-Dame de Paris 4 December 1992. - CD  Réf.: JM 003 -      ADD 
1. Improvisation "néo-classique"  (sortie de vêpres 24 janvier 1988); 2. O. Messiaen (1908-1992): Transports de joie  (sortie de messe 11 mars 1990);  3. Improvisation : paraphrase sur un thème de Nabucco de Verdi (private concert 31 March 1987);  4. F. Liszt (1811-1886): Prélude et fugue sur B.A.C.H.  (sortie de messe 20 mars 1988).
Production : Visual Communication.

 Yves Devernay aux grandes orgues de la cathédrale Notre-Dame de Paris - CD Réf.: 16 214 Mitra Digital
C.-M. Widor : Allegro extract of the Fifth Symphony; E. Devernay: Le Miracle de la Tempête; M. Duruflé: Prélude et Fugue sur le nom d’Alain; J. Guillou: Sinfonietta; J. Langlais: Nazard, extract of the Suite française; M. Dupré: Variations sur un noël; E. Gigout: Toccata.

 Yves Devernay - Improvisations à Notre-Dame de Paris - CD Réf.: D2892 SM 63) Studio SM 
Improvisations au cours d’offices (entrées, offertoires, communions, sorties, versets de vêpres)

References

External links 
 Musica et Memoria Obituaires, Yves Devernay.
 Association des Amis des Orgues de Bruay-la-Buissière Détails biographiques et photos.
 Site de Notre-Dame de Paris  Détails biographiques et photos.
  .
  , March 15, 1992 by Pierre Pincemaille in the Basilique du Saint-Cordon in Valenciennes.

French classical organists
French male organists
Cathedral organists
Conservatoire de Paris alumni
People from Tourcoing
1937 births
1990 deaths
20th-century organists
20th-century French male musicians
20th-century classical musicians
Male classical organists